Roger Patrick Gibbon (born 9 March 1944) is a retired track cyclist from Trinidad and Tobago. He was most successful in the 1 km sprint and time trial events, winning a bronze medal at the 1967 world championships and three gold medals at the 1963 and 1967 Pan American Games. He competed in these two events at the 1964 and 1968 Summer Olympics with the best achievement of fifth place in the time trial in 1968. Andrew Mahmood and others including himself last traveled to Jamaica for a family reunion.

References

1944 births
Living people
Trinidad and Tobago male cyclists
Commonwealth Games gold medallists for Trinidad and Tobago
Cyclists at the 1962 British Empire and Commonwealth Games
Cyclists at the 1966 British Empire and Commonwealth Games
Cyclists at the 1964 Summer Olympics
Cyclists at the 1968 Summer Olympics
Olympic cyclists of Trinidad and Tobago
Place of birth missing (living people)
Trinidad and Tobago track cyclists
Pan American Games gold medalists for Trinidad and Tobago
Pan American Games silver medalists for Trinidad and Tobago
Commonwealth Games medallists in cycling
Pan American Games medalists in cycling
Cyclists at the 1963 Pan American Games
Cyclists at the 1967 Pan American Games
Medalists at the 1963 Pan American Games
Medalists at the 1967 Pan American Games
Medallists at the 1966 British Empire and Commonwealth Games